Bullsbrook (formerly Bullsbrook East) is a northern suburb of Perth, Western Australia in the outer metropolitan area. It is located in the City of Swan. The original Bullsbrook townsite is located slightly west of the current town, on the 17 km mark of the Midland Railway. Bullsbrook is also home to the RAAF Pearce airbase, a major training facility for the Royal Australian Air Force. The suburb is situated on the Great Northern Highway, 25 kilometres north of the Midland Strategic Regional Centre. It is well serviced by several major transport networks including the Great Northern Highway, Railway Parade and the Brand Highway to the north, Chittering Road to the east and Neaves Road to the west. Bullsbrook is also adjacent to the State rail network, providing an opportunity for the development of an intermodal freight transport hub. The site is further strengthened by linkage to the planned Perth-Darwin National Highway via Stock Road.

Although traditionally a predominantly rural suburb, the release in 2008 of the Bullsbrook Commercial Centre offers great scope for expansion in the commercial and light industrial land use capability of Bullsbrook. In addition, the City of Swan is awaiting the State's approval of the draft Bullsbrook Townsite and Rural Strategy which would see further industrial, commercial and residential growth in Bullsbrook.

History

Settlement of the area dates from the 1890s, following the construction of the Midland railway line and military land use commenced from 1935. The most significant development occurred from the 1970s, with further population growth in the early 1990s.

Regarding the origin of the name, the Western Australian Department of Land Information states:

Population
In the 2016 census, there were 5,185 people in Bullsbrook, 66.8% of people were born in Australia. The next most common countries of birth were England 9.7% and New Zealand 3.6%. 84.9% of people spoke only English at home. The most common responses for religion were No Religion 36.1%, Anglican 19.5% and Catholic 18.2%.

Education
Bullsbrook has one school, Bullsbrook College, which takes students from kindergarten to year 12. It was established in 1952. There was previously another school that was built in 1901, and that the present school replaced.

Climate
The Bureau of Meteorology operates a weather station at RAAF Base Pearce. Bullsbrook has a Mediterranean climate (Köppen climate classification Csa), like the rest of the Perth metropolitan region. Bullsbrook is among the hottest parts of the metropolitan region during summer.

References

Suburbs of Perth, Western Australia
Suburbs and localities in the City of Swan